General Lawson may refer to:

Henry Merrick Lawson (1859–1933), British Army lieutenant general
Laurin Leonard Lawson (1876–1938), U.S. Army brigadier general
Richard Lawson (British Army officer) (born 1927), British Army general
Richard L. Lawson (1929–2020), U.S. Air Force four-star general
Robert Lawson (American general) (1748–1805), Virginia Militia brigadier general in the American Revolutionary War
Robert Lawson (British Army officer) (died 1816), British Army lieutenant general
Thomas Lawson (military physician) (1789–1861), U.S. Army brevet brigadier general
Thomas J. Lawson (born 1957), Royal Canadian Air Force general
Edward Lawson, 4th Baron Burnham (1890–1963), British newspaper Territorial Army major general

See also
Attorney General Lawson (disambiguation)